Anthony, John, and Eustathius (Eustathios, Eustace; Russian: Антоний, Иоанн and Евстафий; Lithuanian: Antanas, Jonas ir Eustachijus) are saints and martyrs (died 1347) of the Russian Orthodox Church.  Their feast day is celebrated on April 14 in the horologion.

They were attached to the Muscovite missionaries dispatched to the court of Algirdas, pagan Grand Duke of Lithuania. Algirdas was married to an Orthodox Christian princess, Maria of Vitebsk, and the Orthodox were permitted only to minister to the religious needs of the princess. All outside proselytizing was forbidden.

The three youths were arrested for preaching in public, and were ordered by Algirdas to consume meat in his presence during an Orthodox fasting period. When they refused, they were tortured and executed. Their bodies were kept in a glass reliquary in a crypt chapel beneath the altar of the cathedral church in the Monastery of the Holy Spirit in Vilnius, Lithuania, but has since been moved to the main sanctuary of the church. Their relics are said to be incorruptible.  They were added to the Roman Calendar by Pope Paul VI in 1969.

References

External links
Anthony, John, and Eustathius of Vilnius
Saint of the Day, April 14: Antony (Kukley), Eustace (Nizilon), and John (Milhey)
Martyr Anthony of Vilnius, Lithuania (April 14) at Orthodox Church in America
Icon at Orthodox Church in America

14th-century Christian saints
14th century in Lithuania
Eastern Orthodoxy in Lithuania
Russian saints of the Eastern Orthodox Church
1347 deaths
History of Vilnius
Saints trios
14th-century Eastern Orthodox martyrs
Year of birth unknown